Karim Hadi (born 1 February 1963) is a former Iraqi football forward. He competed in the 1985 Pan Arab Games. Hadi played for Iraq between 1981 and 1987.

References

Living people
Iraqi footballers
Iraq international footballers
1963 births
Association football forwards